DVD by Sexy is the only official DVD from Eagles of Death Metal.

A companion release to Death by Sexy, the DVD compiles footage shot by sometime collaborator Liam Lynch over the course of the album's eight day recording session. Besides the main feature, the DVD also contains numerous live performances and music videos, including the previously unreleased video for the song "Solid Gold".

According to Jesse Hughes, the band initially didn't want to do the DVD:

Track listing
 "I Like To Move In The Night "
 "The Ballad Of Queen Bee And Baby Duck" 
 "Cherry Cola"
 "I Gotta Feelin (Just Nineteen)"
 "Keep Your Head Up "
 "Solid Gold "
 "I Want You So Hard (Boy's Bad News)" 
 "Rehearsal"
 "Speaking in Tongues"
 "I Only Want You"
 "Midnight Creeper"

References

Eagles of Death Metal albums
2006 video albums
2006 live albums
Music video compilation albums
Live video albums
2000s English-language films
Films directed by Liam Lynch